Dryden is an English surname which derives from the Welsh word drwydwn, meaning a 'broken nose'. For other uses, including fictional names, see Dryden (disambiguation). 

Notable people with the surname include:

John Dryden 
 John Dryden (1631–1700), English poet
 John C. Dryden (1893–1952), politician
 John Dryden (footballer), New Zealand international football (soccer) player
 John Dryden (Ontario politician) (1840–1909), farmer and politician
 John Dryden (Kuser) (1897–1964), New Jersey politician
 John F. Dryden (1839–1911), businessman

Other people named Dryden 
 Alice Dryden, English photographer and historian
 Charles Dryden (1860–1931), American baseball writer and humorist
 Charles Dryden (disambiguation), several people
 Dan Dryden, American politician
 Dave Dryden, retired Canadian ice hockey goaltender
 David Owen Dryden, San Diego builder-architect
 Helen Dryden, American artist and designer
 Hugh Latimer Dryden, NASA Deputy Director
 Jim Dryden, New Zealand wrestler
 Ken Dryden, Canadian hockey player and politician
 Konrad Dryden (born 1963), American writer on Italian opera, descendant of John Dryden
 Murray Dryden, Canadian philanthropist
 Nathaniel Dryden (1849–1924), American architect
 Nicole Dryden, two-time Olympic swimmer from Canada
 Richard Dryden, English former professional footballer and former manager of Worcester City F.C.
 Spencer Dryden, American musician who was best known as the drummer for Jefferson Airplane, New Riders of the Purple Sage and The Dinosaurs
 Wheeler Dryden, English actor and film director, father of rock musician Spencer Dryden (above), and half brother of Charlie Chaplin

References

See also
 Dryden baronets

Surnames from nicknames